Saparua is an island east of Ambon Island in the Indonesian province of Maluku; the island of Haruku lies between Saparua and Ambon. The main port is in the south at Kota Saparua. The island of Maolana is located near its southwestern side and Nusa Laut off its southeastern tip.

Saparua was administered as a single eponymous district (kecamatan) of Central Maluku Regency (Kabupaten Maluku Tengah), but in 2012 an additional district of East Saparua was formed from the eastern peninsula of the original district. Kota Saparua (Saparua town) is the administrative centre of the residual (western) district, while Tuhaha is the administrative centre of the new district.

The island (including Maolana) covers a land area of 168.1 km2, and had a population of 32,312 as of the 2010 census and 36,022 at the 2020 Census. The inhabitants of Saparua speak the Saparua language, as well as Indonesian and Ambonese Malay.

Saparua was the location of Indonesian national hero, Pattimura's rebellion against Dutch forces in 1817. It was also the birthplace of G.A. Siwabessy, a prominent politician who was Indonesia's Minister of Health during the 1960s and 1970s.

Villages on Saparua 
There are 17 administrative villages, listed below with their populations at the 2020 Census; ten comprise the new district of East Saparua, while seven remain with the existing Saparua district
 Saparua (3,198)
 Tiouw (1,484)
 Paperu (1,412)
 Booi (927)
 Haria (7,461)
 Portho (2,808)
 Kulur (1,112)

Saparua Timur
 Ouw (1,680)
 Ullath (1,591)
 Siri-sori Amapatti (2,002)
 Siri-sori Amalatu (2,251)
 Tuhaha (2,379)
 Ihamahu (1,509)
 Iha (391)
 Noluth-Titasomi (3,038)
 Itawaka (2,060)
 Mahu (718)

Gallery

References

External links

Old map of Manipa, Haruku, Saparua and Nusalaut
 Saparua island

 
Islands of the Maluku Islands
Central Maluku Regency
Landforms of Maluku (province)
Populated places in Indonesia